"Bros" is the second single from Panda Bear's 2007 album Person Pitch. It was named the third best song of 2007 by Pitchfork Media.

Composition
AllMusic called the song the "album centerpiece" of Person Pitch, describing it as "a 12-minute collage of chiming guitar arpeggios, stony vocal harmonies, hooting owls, and phasing loops that fade in and out of each other." Pitchfork Media wrote that "from sighing multi-tracked vocals to jewel-box loops to caramelized guitar riffs, each layer adds hypnotic depth to a song whose gorgeousness seems dangerously excessive from the start."

Accolades

Track listing
 "Bros"
 "Bros (Terrestrial Tones Mix)"

References

2006 songs
Panda Bear (musician) songs